Right Rev. John Leonard, D.D., was an Irish born priest who served in Ireland and South Africa. Born in Dublin on 15 January 1829, he matriculated in St. Patrick's College, Maynooth in 1849. He was ordained a priest in 1855 by Archbishop of Dublin Paul Cullen.
Dr. Leonard  was curate at Blanchardstown, Co. Dublin, when appointed to succeed Dr. Grimley in Roman Catholic Archdiocese of Cape Town, as Vicar Apostolic of the Cape of Good Home and Titular Bishop of Corada, serving from 1872 until he died on 19 February 1908, he was succeeded by Dr. John Rooney as Bishop.

References 

1829 births
1908 deaths
Alumni of St Patrick's College, Maynooth
Irish expatriate Catholic bishops
Roman Catholic bishops of Cape Town